Dardo means dart in Italian, Portuguese and Spanish.

Dardo may also refer to:

 Dardo IFV, an Italian infantry fighting vehicle
 DARDO, an Italian close-in weapon system
 Dardo (automobile), a Brazilian sports car
 Tibetan name for the Chinese city of Kangding
Dardo-, combing form of the word Dardic
Italian destroyer Dardo, two destroyers built for the Regia Marina
Paul Jason Dardo, American drag queen known as Violet Chachki